is a Japanese manga series written and illustrated by Keitaro Takahashi. It was serialized in Shogakukan's seinen manga magazine Monthly Sunday Gene-X from April 2012 to April 2016, with its chapters collected in seven tankōbon volumes. A prequel, titled Destro 016, started in the same magazine in April 2021.

Publication
Written and illustrated by Keitaro Takahashi, Destro 246 was serialized in Shogakukan's seinen manga magazine Monthly Sunday Gene-X from April 19, 2012, to April 19, 2016. Shogakukan collected its chapters in seven tankōbon volumes, released from October 19, 2012, to June 17, 2016.

A spin-off novel written by Kosuke Fujiwara, titled , was published on February 19, 2019 (with a preview chapter published in Monthly Sunday Gene-X on January 19 of the same year).

A prequel manga, titled , started in Monthly Sunday Gene-X on April 19, 2021. Shogakukan released the first tankōbon volume on November 19, 2021.

Volume list

Destro 246

Destro 016

Reception
The seven volumes of Destro 246 debuted on Oricon's weekly chart of best-selling manga.

Notes

References

External links
 
 

Action anime and manga
Seinen manga
Shogakukan manga